Acontistini is a tribe of neotropical mantises in the superfamily Acanthopoidea, and family Acanthopidae. There are 7 genera and more than 30 described species in Acontistini. In 2016, several genera were moved from Acanthopidae to a newly created family Acontistidae, but this has not been accepted in most recent classifications.

Genera
 Acontista Saussure, 1872
 Astollia Kirby, 1904
 Callibia Stal, 1877
 Ovalimantis Roy, 2015
 Paratithrone Lombardo, 1996
 Raptrix Terra, 1995
 Tithrone Stal, 1877

References

Further reading

External links

Mantodea